The 2023 Major League Soccer season is the 28th season of Major League Soccer (MLS), the top professional soccer league in the United States and Canada. The league will have 29 clubs following the addition of St. Louis City SC as an expansion team in the Western Conference, with Nashville SC moving back to the Eastern Conference. The regular season began on February 25, 2023, and ends on October 21; it will then be followed by the playoffs. The regular schedule was released on December 20, 2022.

Preseason for the 2023 season started in January 2023 and ran into February, and the season began on February 25. The regular season will be paused from July 21 to August 19 for the month-long Leagues Cup, during which time MLS teams will play Liga MX opponents. In June 2022, Apple Inc. and MLS announced a ten-year partnership for the broadcast and streaming rights to all MLS and Leagues Cup games, as well as select MLS Next and MLS Next Pro games, on the MLS Season Pass service within the Apple TV app. Fox Sports retained linear MLS TV rights, while for the first time in league history, ESPN will no longer air matches (Univision opted to only air Leagues Cup games, thus also no longer airing MLS regular-season contests after a combined 19 years).

For the first time since its founding, MLS qualification berths for the 2024 CONCACAF Champions League will not be exclusively allocated to American clubs, allowing expatriated Canadian clubs an opportunity to qualify for the tournament without necessarily winning the Canadian Championship.

Los Angeles FC are the reigning MLS Cup and Supporters' Shield champions; Philadelphia Union are the reigning Eastern Conference champions.

Teams

Stadiums and locations

Personnel and sponsorships

Coaching changes

Regular season

Format

Each of the league's 29 teams will play 34 matches—17 at home and 17 away games; the frequency of opponents is different for each conference due to the unequal number of teams. The 15 Eastern Conference teams will play two matches against every other team in the same conference and one match each against six Western Conference teams. The 14 Western Conference teams will face each other twice as well as an additional one or two matches against an intra-conference team; they will have one match each against six or seven Eastern Conference teams. The regular season is scheduled to begin on February 25 and culminate in Decision Day on October 21, where all teams will play each other in simultaneous intra-conference matches. The season will be paused for the 2023 Leagues Cup from July 15 to August 20 as well as FIFA international windows in October and November; the June and September international windows have a partial pause, with 13 clubs electing to continue playing during then. The majority of matches will be played on Wednesdays and Saturdays at 7:30 p.m. local time as part of the Apple TV+ streaming contract.

The MLS Cup Playoffs will expand to nine teams per conference and a total of 24 matches. Round One in late October consists of a best-of-three series between the top seven teams per conference as well as the winner of a wild card match played by the eighth and ninth placed teams. The Conference Semifinals, Conference Final, and MLS Cup final remain single-elimination matches hosted by the higher-seeded team in late November and early December.

Conference standings

Eastern Conference

Western Conference

Overall table
The leading team in this table wins the Supporters' Shield.

Results

Attendance

Average home attendances

Highest attendances 
Regular season

Player statistics

Goals

Hat-tricks

Assists

Clean sheets

Awards

Team/Player of the Week
Bold denotes League Player of the Week.

Goal of the Week

Player of the Month

References

External links
 

 
Major League Soccer
2023 in Canadian soccer
Major League Soccer
Major League Soccer seasons